Envirofit International is an American non-profit organization that develops technology for reducing air pollution and enhancing energy efficiency in developing nations.

Envirofit's most significant products have been affordable clean burning stoves for poor consumers. Based in Fort Collins, Colorado, Envirofit was founded in 2003 by Tim Bauer, Nathan Lorenz, Paul Hudnut, and Bryan Willson.

History
Envirofit International began in 2003 as an adjunct program to the Colorado State University Engines and Energy Conversion Laboratory.  The program's goal was to bring sustainable clean energy solutions to solve health and energy challenges on a global level.

The first product was a retrofit direct injection technology to reduce pollution from two-stroke cycle vehicle engines in the Philippines. This project won the Rolex Award for Enterprise in 2008.

Clean cook stoves

In 2007, Envirofit partnered with the Shell Foundation's Breathing Space Program to develop clean cook stoves. Envirofit International's first commercial clean cook stove model was produced in India in 2008. In order to meet the demands of consumers throughout the various markets and the growing health concerns of cooking on a traditional stove, Envirofit started to scale the model in 2010.

The stove design was created after engineers studied the flow of heat and smoke in a combustion chamber using computer modeling to determine the best size and shape for the stove. It was found that sheet metal can burn through in a matter of weeks. Therefore, researchers worked to develop a metal and insulation to withstand high temperatures and frequent use at a low cost. The design of the cook stove had to best fit with the consumers using it. Most of the consumers live on $2 to $10 a day and spend several hours preparing food and water for their families to use.

The technology of the clean cook stove has been dubbed "The Rocket Stove" because of the simple yet effective design. The cook stove has a large vertical cylinder that holds a pot and an opening at the bottom to feed the fuel to cook a meal or pasteurize drinking water.  The combustion chamber of the Envirofit stoves use up to 60% less fuel than other stoves or open fires to reduce toxic emissions by up to 80%.

The Envirofit stoves include the CH-4400 charcoal stove, the CH-5200 charcoal stove, the CH-2200 charcoal stove, the Z-3000 Built-In wood stove, the G-3300 wood stove, and the M-500.

Recognition
In 2009, Lorenz and Bauer were named Heroes of the Environment by Time magazine.

In 2013, The Economist named the Envirofit founder as innovators of the year.

See also

Engineers Without Borders

References

Appropriate technology organizations
Economy and the environment
Fuel injection systems
Non-profit organizations based in Colorado
Two-stroke gasoline engines